Jean Valls is a former England international lawn and indoor bowler.

Bowls career
Valls won two bronze medals in the pairs and fours at the 1985 World Outdoor Bowls Championship in Melbourne in addition to winning a bronze medal at the Commonwealth Games

She also won three National Titles; (singles 1983), (pairs 1982 & 1983). She subsequently won the singles at the British Isles Bowls Championships in 1984.

References

English female bowls players
Commonwealth Games medallists in lawn bowls
Commonwealth Games bronze medallists for England
Living people
Year of birth missing (living people)
Bowls players at the 1986 Commonwealth Games
Medallists at the 1986 Commonwealth Games